Within a capitalist economic system, commodification is the transformation of things such as goods, services, ideas, nature, personal information, people or animals into objects of trade or commodities. A commodity at its most basic, according to Arjun Appadurai, is "anything intended for exchange," or any object of economic value.

Commodification is often criticized on the grounds that some things ought not to be treated as commodities—for example, water, education, data, information, knowledge, human life, and animal life.

Terminology 
The earliest use of the word commodification in English attested in the Oxford English Dictionary dates from 1975. Use of the concept of commodification became common with the rise of critical discourse analysis in semiotics.

The terms commodification and commoditization are sometimes used synonymously, particularly in the sense of this article, to describe the process of making commodities out of anything that used not to be available for trade previously; compare anthropology usage.

However, other authors distinguish them (as done in this article), with commodification used in social contexts to mean that a non-commercial good has become commercial, typically with connotations of "corrupted by commerce", while commoditization is used in business contexts to mean when the market for an existing product has become a commodity market, where products are interchangeable and there is heavy price competition. In a quip: "Microprocessors are commoditized. Love is commodified."

Examples 
Concepts that have been argued as having become commercialized include broad items such as patriotism, sport, intimacy, language, nature or the body.

Human commodification 

Commodifications of humans have been discussed in various context, from slavery to surrogacy. Auctions of cricket players by Indian Premier League, Big Bash League and others is also discussed to be a case of human commodification. Virginity auctions are a further example of self-commodification. Human commodity is a term used in case of human organ trade, paid surrogacy (also known as commodification of the womb), and human trafficking. Slave trade as a form of human trafficking is a form of the commodification of people. According to Gøsta Esping-Andersen, people are commodified or 'turned into objects' when selling their labour on the market to an employer.

Animal commodification 

Commodification of animals is one of the earliest forms of commodification, which can be traced back to the time when domestication of animals began. It includes animal slavery in all forms, including use of animals for food, medicine, fashion and cosmetics, medical research, labor and transport, entertainment, wildlife trade, companionship, and so forth. Scholars say that the commodification of nonhuman animals in food systems is directly linked to capitalist systems that prioritize "monopolistically inclined financial interests" over the well-being of humans, nonhumans, and the environment. Over 200 billion land and aquatic animals are killed every year to provide humans with animal products for consumption, which many scholars and activists have described as an "animal holocaust". The extensive use of land and other resources for the production of meat instead of grain for human consumption is a leading cause of malnutrition, hunger, and famine around the world.

Indigenous cultures 
American author and feminist bell hooks described the cultural commodification of race and difference as the dominant culture "eating the other". To hooks, cultural expressions of Otherness, even revolutionary ones, are sold to the dominant culture for their enjoyment. And any messages of social change are not marketed for their messages but used as a mechanism for the dominant ones to acquire a piece of the "primitive".  Any interests in past historical culture almost always have a modern twist. According to Mariana Torgovnick:

What is clear now is that the West's fascination with the primitive has to do with its own crises in identity, with its own need to clearly demarcate subject and object even while flirting with other ways of experiencing the universe.

hooks states that marginalized groups are seduced by this concept because of "the promise of recognition and reconciliation".

When the dominant culture demands that the Other be offered as sign that progressive political change is taking place, that the American Dream can indeed be inclusive of difference, it invites a resurgence of essentialist cultural nationalism.

Commodification of indigenous cultures refers to "areas in the life of a community which prior to its penetration by tourism have not been within the domain of economic relations regulated by criteria of market exchange” (Cohen 1988, 372). An example of this type of cultural commodification can be described through viewing the perspective of Hawaiian cultural change since the 1950s. A Hawaiian Luau, which was once a traditional performance reserved for community members and local people, but through the rise of tourism, this tradition has lost part of its cultural meaning and is now mostly a "for profit" performance.

Public goods 

Public goods like air and water can be subject to commodification.

Internet and Online Communities 
Digital commodification is when a business or corporation uses information from an online community without their knowledge for profit. The commodification of information allows a higher up authority to make money rather than a collaborative system of free thoughts. Massive corporations like Google, Apple, Facebook, Netflix, and Amazon have something of a monopoly online, meaning that the commodification of online communities is accelerated and concentrated. Digital tracking, like cookies, have further commodified the use of the internet because the information is often used for advertising, giving each click, view, or stream monetary value, even if it is an interaction with free content.

Subcultures 
Various subcultures have been argued to as having become commodified, for example the goth subculture, the biker subculture, the tattoo subculture, the witchcraft subculture, and others.

Tourism 
Tourism has been analyzed in the context of commodification in the context of transforming local cultures and heritage into marketable goods. This is related to but distinct from the commodification of indigenous cultures. Rather than commodifying indigenous practices, the commodification of tourism removes local culture from the foreground, replacing it with profitability from non-residents. This may be in the form of entertainment, souvenirs, food markets, or others. Tourism leads, in part, to the commodification of indigenous cultures as people return from visits with partial ideas and representations of the culture.

Holidays 
Many holidays such as Christmas, Halloween or Valentine's Day have been argued as having become commodified. The commodification of a holiday refers to making celebrations necessarily commercial and based on material goods, like gift giving, elaborate decorations, trick or treating, and card giving. Modern celebrations of many holidays are now more related to the commercial practices and profitable tactics than they are to the holiday's origins. For some holidays, like Halloween, there are arguments that the commodification of the original holiday turned it into the celebrations that people now love. The commodification of other holidays, like Christmas, sparks arguments about undoing the commercialization and getting back to the intended spirit of the holiday.

In Marxist theory 

The Marxist understanding of commodity is distinct from its meaning in business. Commodity played a key role throughout Karl Marx's work; he considered it a cell-form of capitalism and a key starting point for an analysis of this politico-economic system. Marx extensively criticized the social impact of commodification under the name commodity fetishism and alienation.

Prior to being turned into a commodity, an object has a "specific individual use value". After becoming a commodity, that same object has a different value: the amount for which it can be exchanged for another commodity. According to Marx, this new value of the commodity is derived from the time taken to produce the good, and other considerations are obsolete, including morality, environmental impact, and aesthetic appeal.

Marx claimed that everything would eventually be commodified: "the things which until then had been communicated, but never exchanged, given, but never sold, acquired, but never bought – virtue, love, conscience – all at last enter into commerce."

See also 

 Big data
 Commercialization
 Commercialization of love
 Commodification of animals
 Decommodification
 Deregulation
 Exchange value
 Human commodity auctions
 Privatization
 Value-form

References

Bibliography 
 Farah, Paolo Davide, Tremolada Riccardo, Desirability of Commodification of Intangible Cultural Heritage: The Unsatisfying Role of IPRs, in TRANSNATIONAL DISPUTE MANAGEMENT, Special Issues "The New Frontiers of Cultural Law: Intangible Heritage Disputes", Volume 11, Issue 2, March 2014,  Available at SSRN.com
 Farah, Paolo Davide, Tremolada Riccardo, Intellectual Property Rights, Human Rights and Intangible Cultural Heritage, Journal of Intellectual Property Law, Issue 2, Part I,  June 2014, Giuffre, pp. 21–47. Available at SSRN.com
 Schimank, Uwe and Volkmann, Ute (ed.): The Marketization of Society: Economizing the Non-Economic. Bremen: Research Cluster "Welfare Societies", 2012.

Further reading 
Polanyi, Karl. "The Self-Regulating Market," Economics as a Social Science, 2nd edn, 2004.

Marxist terminology
Trade